Central Fellowship Christian Academy is a private Christian school in Bibb County, Georgia.

History
Cochran Field Christian Academy was established in 1970 as a segregation academy.  It was one of six new private schools founded in Bibb County in 1970. The number of private schools in Bibb County peaked at 23 in the late 1980s.

In 1979, its sponsor church, Cochran Field Baptist Church, merged with Grace Baptist Church to form Central Fellowship Baptist Church in Macon, Georgia. The school name was changed to Central Fellowship Christian Academy.

References

External links

Christian schools in Georgia (U.S. state)
Schools in Macon, Georgia
Segregation academies in Georgia
Private high schools in Georgia (U.S. state)
Private middle schools in Georgia (U.S. state)
Private elementary schools in Georgia (U.S. state)
Educational institutions established in 1970
1970 establishments in Georgia (U.S. state)